James James (also known by the bardic name Iago ap Ieuan) (1832–1902) was a harpist and musician from Hollybush, Blackwood, Wales. He composed the tune of the Welsh national anthem Hen Wlad fy Nhadau (also known as Land of my Fathers). Today, the same tune is also used for the Breton anthem, Bro Gozh ma Zadoù, and the Cornish anthem, Bro Goth agan Tasow.

Life
James was born on 4 November 1832, at the 'Ancient Druid Inn', Hollybush, in the parish of Bedwellty, Monmouthshire. He was the son of Evan James (1809–1878) and Elizabeth Stradling of Caerphilly. His father, a Welsh poet who wrote under the pen-name of leuan ab lago, moved with his family to Pontypridd, where he carried on the business of weaver and wool merchant, in about 1844. His son James assisted him in the business.

James James composed the melody which was later to be known as Hen Wlad fy Nhadau in January 1856. Its initial title was Glan Rhondda (The banks of the Rhondda), giving rise to the tradition that the tune had come to James as he walked on the bank of the River Rhondda. His father, Evan James, wrote the lyrics that eventually became the words of the Welsh national anthem.

James James died in Aberdare in the Cynon Valley on 11 January 1902. He was buried in the local cemetery at Aberdare, in the same grave as his wife Cecilia and daughter Louisa.

A memorial to James James and his father, in the shape of two figures representing the muses of Poetry and Music, stands in Ynysangharad Park, Pontypridd.

References

Sources

External links
James Memorial at Ynysangharad Park a video clip at the Internet Archive website.
Hen wlad fy nhadau, the national anthem on the National Library of Wales website.
James Memorial in Ynysangharad Park, Pontypridd from the Gathering the Jewels website.
Free scores at the Mutopia Project

1832 births
1902 deaths
People from Pontypridd
Welsh harpists 
Welsh-speaking musicians